The Spring Grove Public Library is a library in Spring Grove, Minnesota.  It is a member of Southeastern Libraries Cooperating, the SE Minnesota library region.

References

External links 
 Online Library Catalog
 Southeastern Libraries Cooperating

Buildings and structures in Houston County, Minnesota
Education in Houston County, Minnesota
Southeastern Libraries Cooperating
Libraries in Minnesota
Public libraries in Minnesota